Earmark may refer to:

Earmark (agriculture), cuts or marks in the ears of animals made to show ownership
Earmark (politics), a legislative provision that directs funds to be spent on specific projects
Earmark (finance), a requirement that a source of revenue be devoted to a specific public expenditure

See also 
 Accountable Fundraising